Orton is a civil parish in the Carlisle district of Cumbria, England.  It contains twelve listed buildings that are recorded in the National Heritage List for England.  Of these, one is listed at Grade II*, the middle of the three grades, and the others are at Grade II, the lowest grade.  The parish contains the village of Great Orton, and the smaller settlements of Little Orton and Baldwinholme, and is otherwise rural.  The listed buildings consist of farmhouses, farm buildings, houses and associated structures, a church, and a war memorial in the churchyard.


Key

Buildings

References

Citations

Sources

Lists of listed buildings in Cumbria
City of Carlisle